Jannetje Van Reypen Tuers was a patriot during the American Revolutionary War and had a role in confirming information about a British conspiracy with Benedict Arnold to take over West Point.

Biography
Jane and her husband Nicholas Tuers (1736/37–1815) (or Toers) lived as farmers in Bergen Township, New Jersey (now known as Jersey City). While selling farm goods in British-occupied Manhattan, she spoke with Samuel Fraunces, the owner of the Fraunces Tavern. He informed Tuers that British soldiers were in his tavern toasting General Benedict Arnold who was to deliver West Point to the British. Tuers informed her brother Daniel Van Reypen about the conspiracy. Van Reypen rode to Hackensack to meet with General Anthony Wayne. Wayne sent Van Reypen to inform General George Washington of the conspiracy. This information added to what was suspected of Benedict Arnold. The arrest of John André a few days later confirmed the conspiracy.

Jane Tuers died in 1834 and was buried in the Old Bergen Church Cemetery.

The house that she lived in was located on Bergen Avenue across from the Tise Tavern. The house survived until 1894, when it was demolished to make room for the construction of the old Fourth Regiment Armory. Streets near Bergen Square bear both the Tuers and Van Reypen family name.

See also
 Bergen Square
 Three Pigeons
 John Champe (soldier)

References

1834 deaths
Women in the American Revolution
People from Hudson County, New Jersey
People of colonial New Jersey
People of New Jersey in the American Revolution
Benedict Arnold
Year of birth unknown
Burials in New Jersey